Oak Valley is the only community of Maralinga Tjarutja Aboriginal Council (AC) Local Government Area (LGA), South Australia. The population fluctuates, but a 2016 survey reported around 128 people, mostly Aboriginal. It is approximately  NNW of the original Maralinga township, and lies at the southern edge of the Great Victoria Desert. It is named for the desert oaks that populate the vicinity of the community.

It was established in 1984 with funds provided as compensation for the dispossession of the Maralinga people from their lands following the British nuclear tests which took place between 1956 and 1963. The risks associated with living in an area contaminated by plutonium, even after the cleanup have been a significant concern.

In 2003 South Australian Premier Mike Rann and Education Minister Trish White opened a new school at Oak Valley, replacing what had been described as the "worst school in Australia". It is now known as Mamungari Conservation Park, and includes the Serpentine Lakes. It was the largest land return since Premier John Bannon's handover of Maralinga lands in 1984. At the 2004 ceremony Premier Rann said the return of the land fulfilled a promise he made in 1991 when he was Aboriginal Affairs Minister, after he passed legislation to return lands including the sacred Ooldea area (which also included the site of Daisy Bates' mission camp) to the Maralinga Tjarutja people.

Images from Oak Valley and the Maralinga lands were the focus of an exhibition at the 2002 Adelaide Festival.

Neighbouring Aboriginal communities
 Tjuntjuntjara, Western Australia (west)
 Anangu Pitjantjatjara Yankunytjatjara (north)
 Yalata, South Australia (south)

Driving distances from Oak Valley to main centres are:
 Ceduna to Oak Valley – 516 km (approx 7 hours)
 Yalata to Oak Valley – 315 km (about 5 hours (via Ooldea))
 Port Lincoln to Oak Valley – 919 km
 Adelaide to Oak Valley – 1288 km

See also
 Oak Valley Ananga School

References

Further reading

External links
 

Aboriginal communities in South Australia
Towns in South Australia
Great Victoria Desert